Bradly van Hoeven (born 17 April 2000) is a Dutch professional footballer who plays as a forward for Eerste Divisie club TOP Oss, on loan from Almere City.

Club career
Born in Maassluis, Van Hoeven played in the youth departments of Excelsior Maassluis and Sparta Rotterdam. In 2018, he was moved to the Sparta reserve team, Jong Sparta, competing in the Tweede Divisie. He made his professional football debut for Sparta on 1 April 2019, in a 2–0 win over MVV Maastricht, coming on as a substitute for Ragnar Ache in the 89th minute. In June 2020, he joined Go Ahead Eagles on a season-long loan. [2]

On 27 June 2021, van Hoeven joined to Eerste Divisie club Almere City FC. On 12 January 2023, he moved on loan to TOP Oss.

Career statistics

Club

Notes

References

2000 births
Living people
Footballers from Maassluis
Dutch footballers
Netherlands youth international footballers
Association football forwards
Eerste Divisie players
Tweede Divisie players
Excelsior Maassluis players
Sparta Rotterdam players
Go Ahead Eagles players
Almere City FC players
TOP Oss players